Marco Piatti (born 15 August 1958) is a Swiss gymnast. He competed in eight events at the 1984 Summer Olympics.

References

1958 births
Living people
Swiss male artistic gymnasts
Olympic gymnasts of Switzerland
Gymnasts at the 1984 Summer Olympics
Place of birth missing (living people)
20th-century Swiss people